Frank Bayard (born 11 October 1971) is a German Catholic priest and 66th Grand Master of the Teutonic Order.

Early life 
After completing an apprenticeship as a banker at Deutsche Bank, Bayard studied business administration and European economics at the Wissenschaftliche Hochschule Lahr (WHL), graduating with a degree in business administration.

Religious life 
In 2000, Bayard entered the Teutonic Order, made his perpetual profession on 19 September 2004, and studied philosophy, Catholic theology, history, and health care management in Innsbruck and Vienna from 2001 to 2008. On 22 July 2006, he received the sacrament of priestly ordination in the Collegiate Church of Weyarn by the Archbishop of Munich and Freising, Friedrich Cardinal Wetter. Since 2015, he has been a parochial vicar of the parish of Gumpoldskirchen in the Archdiocese of Vienna.

In 2006 he was elected to the General Government of the German Order as General Councillor of the German Brotherly Province. From 2008 to 2018, he served as the order's general economist. On 22 August 2018, at the General Chapter of the Teutonic Order in Vienna, Bayard was elected to succeed Bruno Platter as Abbot General and Grand Master of the Order for a six-year term and was immediately installed in office. He was given the abbatial edict by the Archbishop of Vienna, Christoph Schönborn, on 17 November of the same year in St. Stephen's Cathedral in Vienna.

After the founding of the Austrian Conference of Religious Orders in December 2019, as a merger of the Superior's Conference and the Association of Women's Orders of Austria, the women's and men's orders of the Archdiocese of Vienna and the Diocese of Eisenstadt, the  Diocesan Conference of Vienna/Eisenstadt, chaired by Secretary General Christine Rod, appointed Bayard as president of the Diocesan Conference of Vienna/Eisenstadt on 15 September 2020. , Bayard was also appointed a member of the board of the Institute of Austrian Religious Orders.

After the 2022 Russian invasion of Ukraine, Bayard donated €5,000 from himself and €10,000 from the Order to the local government of Malbork in order to help Ukrainian refugees there.

Honours 

  Grand Cross of the Order pro Merito Melitensi – Ecclesiastical class pro Piis Meritis Melitensi (13 October 2021). Awarded as a sign of the solidarity of the two orders of chivalry and in recognition of the achievements of the Teutonic Order in the service of the "Lord's Sick".

References

Further reading
 
 
 </ref>
 </ref>
 </ref>

External links

 Der Hochmeister 

 

1971 births
Living people
Deutsche Bank people
Grand Masters of the Teutonic Order
Recipients of the Order pro Merito Melitensi
German abbots
21st-century German Roman Catholic priests